Kauai King (April 3, 1963 – January 24, 1989) was an American Thoroughbred racehorse was foaled on April 3, 1963 at Sagamore Farm in Glyndon,  Maryland. His sire was Native Dancer and his dam was Sweep In. In 1966, Kauai King won the first two legs of the U.S. Triple Crown. To date, Kauai King is one of only two horses born in Maryland to have crossed the Kentucky Derby finish line first, but 1968 winner Dancer's Image was later stripped of his title, leaving Kauai King as the only official Maryland-bred winner of the Derby.

Racing career

Ridden by jockey Don Brumfield, Kauai King won the 1966 Kentucky Derby and Preakness Stakes but finished fourth in the Belmont Stakes at Aqueduct Racetrack, two lengths behind the winner, Amberoid. With his sire (Native Dancer) and grandsire (Polynesian), three successive generations won the Preakness Stakes, a feat accomplished only one other time. On June 16, the colt was sold to a horse breeding syndicate for a then record price of $2,520,000.

Other top three-year-olds in 1966 included Graustark and 1965 Champion 2-Year-Old Colt Buckpasser. The undefeated Graustark's racing career ended with a broken coffin bone in the Blue Grass Stakes,  and an injury kept Buckpasser out of the Triple Crown races. Even after Kauai King's wins in the Kentucky Derby and the Preakness Stakes, there was much speculation as to which was the better horse. On June 27, 1966, Kauai King (against the advice of his trainer, Henry Forrest) and Buckpasser met in the Arlington Classic. Kauai King's racing career came to an end when he pulled a ligament in his leg during the race. Following the announcement of his career-ending injury, he was retired to stand at stud at Alfred G. Vanderbilt II's Sagamore Farm in Glyndon, Maryland. Kauai King is still one of only two dual Classic winners ever bred in Maryland (the other was Cloverbrook, foaled in 1874) and one of only nine to win a Triple Crown race.

Retirement

Kauai King proved less than successful as a sire. Near the end of 1971, he was shipped to stand at stud in England. He remained there until 1973. He then was sent to a breeding farm in Japan where he died on January 24, 1989.

Breeding

References

 Multiple New York Times articles on Kauai King
 Kauai King's Pedigree Chart
 Kauai King's Kentucky Derby
 Kauai King on Maryland Thoroughbred Hall of Fame
 Maryland-bred Thoroughbred Honor Roll of Champions

1963 racehorse births
1989 racehorse deaths
Racehorses bred in Maryland
Racehorses trained in the United States
Kentucky Derby winners
Preakness Stakes winners
Thoroughbred family A4